Dorothea "Dot" Farley (February 6, 1881 – May 2, 1971) was an American film actress who appeared in 280 motion pictures between 1910 and 1950. She was also known as Dorothy Farley.

Biography 

Born in Chicago, Illinois, Dorothea Farley was the daughter of Eugene Farley and actress Alma Streeter. Her nickname originated when she sang and danced on stage billed as "Chicago's Little Dot" when she was three years old.

Farley gained acting experience by working for six years in stock theater and made her film debut in 1910. Mainly known for her roles in short comedies, prolific with Mack Sennett in the silent days, she also appeared in Western films in the early 1910s. She was later notable as the mother-in-law of Edgar Kennedy in most of his series of short films at the RKO studios.

Farley was also a writer, with 260 of her stories having been produced by 1924.

Death
Farley died in South Pasadena, California on May 2, 1971, aged 90.

Selected filmography 

 Murphy's I.O.U. (1913, Short) – Wife
 The Bangville Police (1913, Short) – Della's Mother
 Passions, He Had Three (1913, Short)
 Peeping Pete (1913, Short)
 Fatty Joins the Force (1913, Short) – Fatty's Sweetheart (uncredited)
 Some Nerve (1913, Short) – The Wife
 The Price of Crime (1914) – Dorothea Vale
 The Toll of the War-Path (1914) – Bess
 Even Unto Death (1914) – Dorothea Gordon
 Inherited Passions (1916) – Masie Williams
 A Small Town Idol (1921) – Mrs. Smith
 Home Talent (1921) – Boarder
 The Crossroads of New York (1922) – Landlady
 When Knights Were Cold (1923, Short) – (uncredited)
 Tea: With a Kick! (1923) – Mrs. Juniper
 The Acquittal (1923) – Maid
 Boy of Mine (1923) – Mrs. Pettis
 The Mask of Lopez (1924) – Townswoman
 Listen Lester (1924) – Miss Pink
 A Self-Made Failure (1924) – Minor Role (uncredited)
 The Enemy Sex (1924) – Ida Summers
 The Signal Tower (1924) – Cousin Gertie
 The Fatal Mistake (1924)
 Vanity's Price (1924) – Katherine, Vanna's maid
 So Big (1924) – Widow Paarlenburg
 Border Intrigue (1925) – Tough's Sister
 My Son (1925) – Hattie Smith
 The Three Way Trail (1925)
 Dr. Pyckle and Mr. Pryde (1925, Short) – Townswoman (uncredited)
 Rugged Water (1925) – Mrs. Fuller
 The Unchastened Woman (1925)
 The Red Kimona (1925) – The Inquisitive One
 A Woman of the World (1925) – Mrs. Fox
 The Lure of the Track (1925)
 Memory Lane (1926) – Maid
 The Grand Duchess and the Waiter (1926) – The Countess Prascovia Avaloff
 The Little Irish Girl (1926) – Gertie
 Brooding Eyes (1926) – Marie De Costa
 The Still Alarm (1926) – Mrs. Maloney
 Money Talks (1926) – Mrs. Chatterton
 So This Is Paris (1926) – Madame Moreau (uncredited)
 Honesty – The Best Policy (1926) – Author's Wife (added sequence)
 The Family Upstairs (1926) – Mademoiselle Clarice
 Young April (1926) – Maggie
 The Timid Terror (1926) – Mrs. Milliken
 Nobody's Widow (1927) – Roxanna's Maid
 The Overland Stage (1927) – Aunt Viney
 McFadden's Flats (1927) – Bridget Maloney
 Girl in the Rain (1927)
 The Shamrock and the Rose (1927)
 All Aboard (1927) – Aunt Patsy
 The King of Kings (1927) – Maidservant of Caiaphas
 Yours to Command (1927) – Ma O'Brien
 The Lost Limited (1927)
 His First Flame (1927) – Mrs. Benedict
 The Climbers (1927) – Juana
 The Tired Business Man (1927) – Mrs. McGinnis
 Topsy and Eva (1927) – Minor Role (uncredited)
 Breakfast at Sunrise (1927) – Telephone Operator (uncredited)
 The Girl from Everywhere (1927) – Madame Zweibach
 The Garden of Eden (1928) – Monte Carlo Telephone Operator (uncredited)
 Lady Be Good (1928) – Texas West
 Black Feather (1928)
 The Code of the Scarlet (1928) – Widow Malone
 The Head Man (1928) – Mrs. Denny
 Celebrity (1928) – Mother
 Should a Girl Marry? (1928) – Mae Reynolds
 Marquis Preferred (1929) – Mrs. Gruger
 Divorce Made Easy (1929) – Aunt Emma
 Why Leave Home? (1929) – Susan
 Harmony at Home (1930) – The Modiste
 The Unholy Three (1930) – Woman Buying Parrot (uncredited)
 Road to Paradise (1930) – Lola
 The Little Accident (1930) – Mrs.Van Dine
 The Third Alarm (1930) – Woman Barber
 The Front Page (1931) – Madame (uncredited)
 A Woman of Experience (1931) – Beer Garden Patron (uncredited)
 Dancing Dynamite (1931) – Effie
 The Law of the Tong (1931) – Madam Duval
 While Paris Sleeps (1932) – Concierge
 Trapped in Tia Juana (1932) – Aunt Emma
 Lawyer Man (1932) – Client Paying $5,000 Fee (uncredited)
 Curtain at Eight (1933) – Ella – Party Guest
 Love Past Thirty (1934) – Dressmaker
 Down to Their Last Yacht (1934) – Passenger with Diamond Bracelets (uncredited)
 Diamond Jim (1935) -Barmaid (uncredited)
 False Pretenses (1935) – Mrs. Smythe
 Ring Around the Moon (1936) – Bella
 Dummy Ache (1936, Short) – Florence's Mother
 Wanted! Jane Turner (1936) – Landlady (uncredited)
 Arizona Mahoney (1936) – Woman at Circus (uncredited)
 Love Is News (1937) – Woman Wanting Steve's Autograph (uncredited)
 We Have Our Moments (1937) – (uncredited)
 Too Many Wives (1937) – Mrs. Potts
 Rustlers' Valley (1937) – Mrs. Anson (uncredited)
 The Purple Vigilantes (1938) – Suffrogate (uncredited)
 The Road to Reno (1938) – Mrs. Brumleigh
 The Stranger from Arizona (1938) – Martha
 Slander House (1938) – Mrs. Willis
 Lawless Valley (1938) – Anna
 I Stole a Million (1939) – Minor Role (uncredited)
 The Women (1939) – Large Woman (uncredited)
 $1,000 a Touchdown (1939) – Hysterical Woman (uncredited)
 We Go Fast (1941) – Hempstead's Cook (uncredited)
 Look Who's Laughing (1941) – Mrs. Mary Blaize (uncredited)
 Obliging Young Lady (1942) – Bird Lover Who Did Paper on Shrikes (uncredited)
 Tales of Manhattan (1942) – Party Guest (Fields sequence) (uncredited)
 Cat People (1942) – Mrs. Agnew (uncredited)
 Hers to Hold (1943) – Wife of Soldier (uncredited)
 Hail the Conquering Hero (1944) – Mamie's Mother (uncredited)
 San Fernando Valley (1944) – Hattie O'Toole
 The Sin of Harold Diddlebock (1947) – Smoke's Secretary (uncredited)
 They Won't Believe Me (1947) – Emma (uncredited)
 Fighting Father Dunne (1948) – Mrs. Monohan (uncredited)
 The File on Thelma Jordon (1949) – Woman Prisoner (uncredited)

References

External links 

Dot Farley at Women Film Pioneers Project

1881 births
1971 deaths
Actresses from Chicago
American film actresses
American silent film actresses
20th-century American actresses
Burials at Forest Lawn Memorial Park (Glendale)
Women film pioneers
Western (genre) film actresses
American stage actresses